Jacob Hausmann (born August 12, 1997) is an American football tight end. He played college football at Ohio State and was signed as an undrafted free agent by the Detroit Lions in 2021.

College career
Hausmann was ranked as a fourstar recruit by 247Sports.com coming out of high school. He committed to Ohio State on January 25, 2015.

Professional career

Detroit Lions
Hausmann was signed as an undrafted free agent by the Detroit Lions on May 1, 2021. He was waived on August 6, 2021.

New York Giants
On August 7, 2021, Hausmann was claimed off waivers by the New York Giants. He was waived on August 31, 2021 and re-signed to the practice squad the next day. He was released on October 19, but re-signed on October 25. On November 5, 2021, Hausmann was released from the practice squad. On November 24, 2021, Hausmann was signed back to the practice squad. He signed a reserve/futures contract with the Giants on January 10, 2022. He was waived on May 10, 2022.

Seattle Seahawks
Hausmann signed with the Seattle Seahawks on July 27, 2022, and was waived on August 5, 2022.

Washington Commanders
Hausmann signed with the Washington Commanders on August 22, 2022, but was released on August 30.

References

1997 births
Living people
American football tight ends
Ohio State Buckeyes football players
Detroit Lions players
New York Giants players
Seattle Seahawks players
Washington Commanders players